Dichomeris yanagawanus is a moth in the family Gelechiidae. It was described by Shōnen Matsumura in 1931. It is found in Japan.

Lepidoptera and Some Other Life Forms lists this name as a synonym of Dichomeris oceanis Meyrick, 1920.

References

Moths described in 1931
yanagawanus